Oscar Edwin Huber (August 22, 1917 – September 9, 2017) was an American politician in the state of South Dakota. He was a member of the South Dakota House of Representatives from 1961 to 1972. He is an alumnus of Northern State University and the University of Minnesota. Huber was a farmer/rancher and  resided in Bowdle, South Dakota. He died at the age of 100 on September 9, 2017.

References

1917 births
2017 deaths
People from Edmunds County, South Dakota
Northern State University alumni
University of Minnesota alumni
Farmers from South Dakota
Ranchers from South Dakota
American centenarians
Men centenarians
Republican Party members of the South Dakota House of Representatives